Montier may refer to:

Places

United States 
 Montier, Missouri, a census-designated place in southwestern Shannon County
 Montier Township, Shannon County, Missouri

France 
 Montier-en-Der, a former commune in the Haute-Marne department in north-eastern France
 Montier-en-Der Abbey, a former Benedictine, later Cluniac, abbey, dissolved during the French Revolution
 Montier-en-l'Isle, a commune in the Aube department in north-central France
 Montiers,  a commune in the Oise department in northern France
 Montiers-sur-Saulx, a commune in the Meuse department in Grand Est in north-eastern France
 Forest-Montiers, a commune in the Somme department in Hauts-de-France in northern France

People 
 Charles Montier, a French racing driver and automotive engineer
 Ferdinand Montier, a French racing driver, son of Charles
 Neil Montier, a London-born photographer and digital artist

Other 
 Montier & Gillet, a French automobile manufactured only in 1897